Paranoid Girls is a 2015 Spanish comedy film, directed by Pedro del Santo in his directorial debut.

Plot
Three Spanish girls get involved in the fashion business and experience the glam and the glitter and also may some money. They find out that business has a dark side and there are people who try to exploit the rookies.

Cast
Patricia Valley ... Veronica
Antonio Ibáñez ... Miguel
Ángel de Miguel ... Andrés
Bárbara de Lema ... Diana
Rafa Ramos ... Jorge

References

External links

Spanish comedy films
2010s Spanish films